Pardes Institute of Jewish Studies is a Jewish educational institution based in Jerusalem with programs worldwide.

History 
Pardes was launched by Rabbi Michael Swirsky in the fall of 1972 with the support of the World Zionist Organization, which provided the facility and covered overhead costs. The institute began with 25 students in 1972.

Programs
Pardes programs include:
 The Pardes Year Program
 The Pardes 2.5 and 3-week Summer Programs
 The Pardes Community Education Program
 The Pardes Center for Jewish Educators
 The Pardes Center for Judaism and Conflict Resolution
 The Pardes Executive Learning Seminar
 The Pardes Kollel
 Other Pardes Programs

Partnerships 
Pardes partners include:
 Avi Chai is a sponsor for the Pardes Educators Program
 Hebrew College
 Hillel: The Foundation for Jewish Campus Life
 Jewish Agency for Israel's Masa program

See also
Education in Israel

References

External links
 Pardes website

Education in Jerusalem
Educational institutions established in 1971
Jewish educational organizations